The Bangladesh Volleyball Federation is the national federation for volleyball and is responsible for governing the sport in Bangladesh. Mr. Md. Atiqul Islam is the president and Ashiqur Rahman Miku is the general secretary of the federation.

The federation also runs many national and international tournaments.

National Tournaments

International Tournaments 

!Bangabandhu Volleyball Championship 
!2022
!
!
|-

History
Bangladesh Volleyball Federation was established in 1973 by the Government of Bangladesh. Since its founding the federation has held national volleyball tournaments for men and women.

References

Volleyball in Bangladesh
National members of the Asian Volleyball Confederation
1973 establishments in Bangladesh
Sports organizations established in 1973
Volleyball
Organisations based in Dhaka